Tetiana Shtyreva-Volynkina (11 September 1954 – 2008) was a Soviet diver. She competed at the 1972 Summer Olympics and the 1976 Summer Olympics.

References

1954 births
2008 deaths
Soviet female divers
Olympic divers of the Soviet Union
Divers at the 1972 Summer Olympics
Divers at the 1976 Summer Olympics
Sportspeople from Lviv